Estimated ultimate recovery or Expected ultimate recovery (EUR) of a resource is the sum of the proven reserves at a specific time and the cumulative production up to that point.

References

Petroleum production
Petroleum economics